A battery eliminator is a device powered by an electrical source other than a battery, which then converts the source to a suitable DC voltage that may be used by a second device designed to be powered by batteries. A battery eliminator does away with the need to replace batteries but may remove the advantage of portability. A battery eliminator is also effective in replacing obsolete battery designs.

Some examples of battery eliminators include the nine-volt mains power supply, the size and shape of a PP12 battery, originally intended to replace the battery in portable radios in the 1960s. A solar panel providing power for a portable appliance may also be considered a battery eliminator. The term is also sometimes used as a misnomer when using a bigger battery for more runtime when branching out a power supply to wired electrical equipment using DC input.

History
Early commercial battery eliminators were produced by the Edward S. Rogers, Sr. company in 1925 as a complement to his line of "batteryless" radio receivers. Another early producer of battery eliminators was the Galvin Manufacturing Corporation (later known as Motorola), which was opened on September 25, 1928 by Paul Galvin and his brother Joseph E. Galvin, to build battery eliminators for radio receivers installed in automobiles.

The first car radio receivers were based on vacuum tube technology which required two or three different voltages to function:
 "A"/LT (Low Tension (UK usage), low voltage (US usage)) typically 4 or 6.3 volts at high current to power the filaments
 "B"/HT (High Tension (UK usage), high voltage (US usage) typically 100 to 300 volts at low current to power the anode circuitry
 "C" Additional voltages were sometimes also required for grid bias.

Batteries designed for these portable vacuum tube receivers were a combination of several different battery types and sizes, combined in a single package and intended to slowly wear out at about the same rate. The battery typically connected to the radio via a specially shaped four- or five-pin connector, keyed so that the plug had to be inserted correctly.  A battery eliminator took the typical 6-volt or 12-volt DC power from a car battery and transformed it into the required LT and HT needed to power the vacuum tubes in a car radio.  Without a battery eliminator, it was necessary to occasionally replace the battery pack in the vacuum-tube car radio.

Studio photography 
Tripod-mounted cameras in photography studios often use a battery eliminator to avoid having to interrupt lengthy shooting sessions to replace batteries.

See also
Batteryless radio
Batteryless switch
Battery eliminator circuit (BEC), a circuit typically used for radio-controlled models, where a low-power radio receiver obtains its supply from the main traction battery, without needing a separate receiver battery.

References

Power supplies
Electric power conversion